Vagus Vetus is the sixth studio album by Czech black metal band Master's Hammer, released on 18 May 2014 through the band's own record label, Jihosound Records, founded the year prior. It is the group's second concept album so far, the first one being Jilemnický okultista, released in 1992.

The album tells the surreal adventures of an imaginary old wanderer, whose name is Vagus Vetus, through an "unfamiliar labyrinth" where "there's nothing good waiting for him. Disgusted with progress and modernity of all kinds, he enjoys listening to Aeolian harps and sounds of postmortal flatulence. He finds his consolation in hedonic experiences of natural origin".

The track "Panuška" is a tribute to Czech painter Jaroslav Panuška (1872–1958).

Track listing

Personnel
 František "Franta" Štorm – vocals, guitar, bass, drums, production, cover art
 Tomáš "Necrocock" Kohout – guitar
 Honza "Silenthell" Přibyl – timpani

Notes

References

External links
Vagus Vetus at Discogs

2014 albums
Master's Hammer albums
Concept albums